Bohdan Vesolovsky (  30 May 1915 – 17 December 1971) was a Ukrainian composer and songwriter.

Biography 
He was born in Vienna. After the First World War his family moved to Stryi, as for that moment - Poland. He studied at the Faculty of Law of Lviv University (graduated in 1937) and Stryi branch of Mykola Lysenko Higher Music Institute. He also graduated from the Consular Academy in Vienna in 1939.

At the age of 16 he started writing music, at the age of 22 he wrote one of his most popular songs - "There will come another time" (Прийде ще час). Already the first musical works brought Bohdan Vesolovsky fame. In the 1930s, together with the violinist Leonid Yablonsky and the accordionist Anatoliy Kos-Anatolsky, he was a member of Jablonsky Jazz Chapel (Yabtso-Jazz; the soloist was Iryna Yarosevych). The jazz band was a great success at parties of Lviv youth of the interwar period, in particular at corporate balls.

During World War II he was an officer in Austria-German boundary. Since 1949 lived in Canada. In Canada Bohdan Vesolovsky worked as a chief-editor of Ukrainian version of Radio Canada International in Montreal. In 1960 Vesolovsky was allowed to visit USSR. Vesolovsky died in Monreal were was buried. Upon 20 years reburied in Stryi according to his testament.

Legacy 
According to Bohdan Vesolovsky, the immediate impetus of his composing skills was the lack of Ukrainian entertainment music. At that time, Polish music dominated. Only quality could compete with it. The song heritage of the composer includes more than 130 works. Songs of the first (Lviv) period are mainly tango, foxtrot, light waltz. The lyrics of these songs was mostly about love. In the following years, the songs acquired a bright civic sound ("Fly, sad song" and "Charm of the Carpathian Mountains").

After the World War II songs by Vesolovsky were forbidden in USSR, though were performed anonymously. The revival of Veselovsky's music in Ukraine rises in 2000s. In 2001, with the participation of the composer's wife Olena Vesolovska (Zalizniak), the first collection of Vesolovsky's songs was published, which included 56 works. Late a famous Ukrainian singer Oleh Skrypka recorded two albums based on Vesolovsky's songs found in Toronto - "My Heart is Vulnerable" (2009)  and "Dahlia" (2011).

Since 2015 an annual Music festival in memory of Vesolovsky took place in Ukraine.

References

Sources
Bondi Vesolovsky and Yabtso Jazz: swinging Lviv in the 1920s-30s
 Ostash, Ihor. (2013) Бонді, або повернення Богдана Весоловського [Bondi or Bjhdan Vesolovsky's returning]. Duliby. 
 Lukanov U. (2000) Піонер легкого жанру [Pioneer of light genre]. Day.
 Symonenko, Volodymyr (2004). Ukrainian encyclopedia of jazz. Kyiv, page 24
 Ukrainian music encyclopedia (2006). Rylski Institut. Kyiv. page 344

Ukrainian composers
1915 births
1971 deaths
Polish emigrants to Canada
Ukrainians in Poland
Musicians from Vienna
Ukrainian people in the Austrian Empire
Canadian people of Ukrainian descent
News editors
Radio editors
Canadian radio producers